Robert John Vincent Sweeny Jr. (July 25, 1911 – October 21, 1983) was an American amateur golfer, socialite, businessman and Second World War Royal Air Force bomber pilot. He competed in all four men's major golf championships, including many Masters and British Opens. In 1937, he won the British Amateur Championship.

Early life and family
Sweeny's paternal grandfather, Charles Sweeny, was an Irish immigrant who made his fortune in mining in the Coeur d'Alene region. "Bob" or "Bobby" was the youngest of four sons of Robert and Teresa Sweeny. Robert Sr. was a successful lawyer in Los Angeles, before moving to New York City in 1916 to pursue business opportunities and enlarge the family fortune. One uncle was Charles Sweeny (1882–1963), a soldier of fortune and officer in various armies.

He and his older brother Charles Francis Sweeny (1909–1993) grew up in Manhattan luxury. The brothers attended Loyola School in New York City and Canterbury School in New Milford, Connecticut. The family regularly vacationed in Europe. Robert Sweeny Sr. either joined or in 1926 founded the Federated Trust and Finance Corporation of London, and by the late 1920s, had homes in Wimbledon and Le Touquet.

Bobby followed his brother to Wadham College, Oxford, though it took him over two years to pass the entrance exam.

Amateur golf career 
Both brothers competed in the 1927 Boys Amateur Championship; Bobby lost in the fourth round.

When he graduated, he joined Philip Hill and Partners, a London investment banking firm, but showed more interest in his golf.

He made his debut in the Amateur Championship in 1929, shortly before his 18th birthday. In his fourth attempt, he reached the semi-finals in 1935. He lost in the semi-finals of both the 1933 and 1934 Open de France. In 1937, he won the British Amateur Championship and the Golf Illustrated Gold Vase, the latter by seven strokes.

He received one of four foreign invitations to the 3rd Masters Tournament in 1936. He would go on to play in numerous Masters: 
 1936: tied for 44th
 1940: tied for 39th
 1949: 52nd
 1950: tied for 51st
 1951: tied for 55th
 1952: tied for 55th
 1953: tied for 34th
 1954: 63rd
 1955: withdrew pre-tournament
 Cut instituted in 1957
 1959: missed cut
 1960: missed cut
 1961: missed cut

He also played in many Opens:
 1932: 44th
 1934: missed cut
 1935: 46th
 1937: missed cut
 1939: 33rd
 1946: missed cut
 1959: missed cut
 1967: missed cut
 1968: missed cut
 1970: missed cut

In 1946, he shared the inaugural Berkshire Trophy with John Beck and lost to Jimmy Bruen in the final of the British Amateur Championship.

In 1954, Arnold Palmer beat him, 1 up, in the U.S. Amateur final. Palmer considered this his first major victory and the "turning point" of his career.

Second World War 
Sweeny tried to join the Royal Air Force (RAF) as a fighter pilot, but was turned away due to his being considered too old at 28 or 29 years of age. He was eventually made adjutant of No. 71 Squadron RAF, but managed to become a bomber pilot, flying the Consolidated B-24 Liberator with No. 224 Squadron RAF. He participated in the sinking of two U-boats in the Bay of Biscay within the space of a few days. In the second clash, Sweeny's Liberator was hit, but he managed to return to base on three engines. For this second action, he was awarded the Distinguished Flying Cross in September 1943.

Flight Lieutenant Sweeny was given a medical discharge on September 27, 1945, retaining the rank of squadron leader.

Personal life 
Barbara Hutton, one of the wealthiest women in the world, was in the process of divorcing her second husband in 1938 and 1939. Newspapers speculated whether Sweeny was to become her third. They had a serious relationship, but Hutton ended up marrying movie star Cary Grant in 1942.

In 1948, Sweeny met 18-year-old New York debutante Joanne Marie Connelley. Despite their significant age difference, they married the following year. They had two daughters, Sharon (born 1950) and Brenda (born 1952). However, he divorced her in 1953 when she was allegedly caught in a compromising situation with playboy Porfirio Rubirosa.

References

1911 births
1983 deaths
Alumni of Wadham College, Oxford
Amateur golfers
American male golfers
American World War II bomber pilots
Recipients of the Distinguished Flying Cross (United Kingdom)
Royal Air Force officers
Royal Air Force pilots of World War II
Sportspeople from Pasadena, California